Botswana competed at the 1974 British Commonwealth Games. They were represented by seven athletes in two sports.

Athletics

Men's 400 metres
Wilfred Kareng
Blackie Masalila

Men's 800 metres
Samuel Ditsele
John Rantao

Cycling (track)

 Men's 10 mile scratch race
Stanley Nthupisang
Jack Ntshweu

 Men's 4000 metre individual pursuit
Stanley Nthupisang

Sources
 Official results by country

Botswana at the Commonwealth Games
Nations at the 1974 British Commonwealth Games
Commonwealth Games